Julie Murphy (born 1961) is an English singer. She sings in the Welsh band Fernhill, as well as performing and recording as a solo artist. She has also collaborated musically with John Cale (performing together in the film Beautiful Mistake), and Afro Celt Sound System (in a duet with Robert Plant of Led Zeppelin).

Biography
Murphy was born in Highgate, London, but spent her formative years in Romford, Essex. Her family was originally from Blackpool, Lancashire. She attended Maidstone College of Art and subsequently moved to Wales. She sings both in English and Welsh.

Discography

Solo albums and EPs
 Black Mountains Revisited (1999)
 Lilac Tree (2002)
 The Fall – EP (2011)
 A Quiet House (2012)
 Mermaid – EP (2014)
 Every Bird That Flies (2016)

Fernhill albums
Ca’ nôs (Beautiful Jo Records, 1996)
Llatai (Beautiful Jo Records, 1998)
Whilia (Beautiful Jo Records, 2000)
hynt  (Beautiful Jo Records, 2003)
Na Prádle (live) (Beautiful Jo Records, 2007)
Canu Rhydd (disgyfrith, 2011)

Collaborative albums
 Ffawd (2000), with Dylan Fowler.
 English Songs of Love (2001), with Lynne Denman and Joanne Acty.

Whirling Pope Joan (Julie Murphy and Nigel Eaton)
 Spin (1994)

References

External links
Julie Murphy official website
Fernhill official website

1961 births
English folk singers
Living people
People from Highgate
Singers from London
20th-century English women singers
20th-century English singers
21st-century English women singers
21st-century English singers